"Captain Hook" is a song by American rapper Megan Thee Stallion from her third EP Suga (2020). It was released as the second single from the EP on March 10, 2020, alongside a music video.  Following its release, a TikTok dance choreographed by TikTok star Skaibeauty quickly went viral.

Music video 
The music video was directed by Megan Thee Stallion herself. It opens with her at a studio writing the song's lyrics on her notepad, before going to the booth to rap them. While performing, she twerks and dances and a party starts, involving gambling and a lot of alcohol drinking. Rapper Yella Beezy makes a cameo in the video.

Charts

Certifications

References 

2020 singles
2020 songs
Megan Thee Stallion songs
Songs written by Megan Thee Stallion
Trap music songs
300 Entertainment singles
Warner Music Group singles